Casey McQuiston is an American author of romance novels in the new adult fiction genre, best known for their New York Times best-selling debut novel Red, White & Royal Blue, in which the son of America's first female president falls in love with a prince of England, and sophomore book One Last Stop. McQuiston made their debut in the young adult fiction genre with their book I Kissed Shara Wheeler which was released on May 3, 2022. They were included in Time magazine's 2022 Time 100 Next list.

Personal life 
McQuiston was born on January 21, 1991 and grew up in Baton Rouge, Louisiana, U.S.

They attended Louisiana State University and received a degree in journalism. Prior to publishing their first book, McQuiston waited tables, freelanced and worked extensively in magazine publishing.

McQuiston is queer. They are non-binary and use they/them pronouns. McQuiston has expressed that they write romantic comedies about queer people because they grew up attending a conservative evangelical Christian school and they want to write books that would have made them feel less isolated as a queer teenager.

Additionally, McQuiston is open about having ADHD and how it affects their writing. They describe their writing process as "impulse-driven" and frequently write scenes nonlinearly. After losing their dad in 2014 and struggling with mental health in 2015, McQuiston turned to writing as a way to cope.

McQuiston previously lived in Fort Collins, Colorado but currently lives in New York City, New York with their poodle mix, Pepper.

Career 
McQuiston is currently represented by Sara Megibow at KT Literary. Additionally, they were a 2020 recipient of the Alex Awards for their debut book Red, White & Royal Blue.

Red, White & Royal Blue

Red, White & Royal Blue is a contemporary queer romance that follows Alex Claremont-Diaz, a fictionalized First Son of the U.S., as he develops romantic feelings for Henry, an English prince, following an altercation that forces them to fake a friendship for damage control and PR purposes.

McQuiston first came up with the idea for what would become Red, White & Royal Blue in early 2016 as they followed the 2016 American presidential elections. While watching a season of the HBO comedy series Veep and reading both a Hillary Clinton biography by Carl Bernstein, A WOMAN IN CHARGE: The Life of Hillary Rodham Clinton, and The Royal We by Heather Cocks and Jessica Morgan, McQuiston found themself intrigued by the extravagant, high-profile lifestyle of the royals and wanted to write their own take on a story featuring a royal family. Some additional inspirations behind Red, White & Royal Blue include All the Truth is Out by Matt Bai and Pride and Prejudice by Jane Austen.

McQuiston describes Red, White & Royal Blue as a queer romcom and says that they write queer fiction "for the same reason straight people write straight fiction," meaning that they draw from their own experiences. For protagonist Alex's realization that he's bisexual, they were inspired by their own experience. The character of the fictional American president Ellen Claremont in the novel was inspired by American politician Wendy Davis, whose filibuster McQuiston watched in 2013 and found themself moved by.

As part of their research for Red, White & Royal Blue, McQuiston used websites such as whitehousemuseum.org to study both past and present White House interiors that would be incorporated into the novel.

In April 2019, Amazon Studios acquired the film rights to the novel at auction, with Ted Malawer attached as writer and Berlanti Studios as producer.

Red, White & Royal Blue was published by St. Martin's Griffin in May 2019 and debuted on the New York Times Paper Trade Fiction bestseller list, at number 15. It was received favorably by critics, earning a starred review from Publishers Weekly, Kirkus, Booklist, Vogue and Vanity Fair.

It has been published and translated in Argentina, Bolivia, Brazil, Chile, Colombia, Costa Rica, Czech Republic, Dominican Republic, Ecuador, El Salvador, Finland, Germany, Guatemala, Honduras, Hungary, Mexico, Nicaragua, Panama, Paraguay, Peru, Poland, Portugal, Serbia, Sweden, Puerto Rico, Romania, Russia, Spain, Israel, and Uruguay.

Red, White & Royal Blue won the Best Debut Novel and Best Romance Novel categories in the 11th Annual Goodreads Choice Awards, making it the only novel to win in two categories in 2019.

In interviews, McQuiston has expressed hopes that Red, White & Royal Blue, along with their future novels, will help push queer romance into the spotlight. When asked about their writing process for this book, Mcquiston said they knew from the get-go that they wanted to write a queer-romance but didn't plan out each character before they began writing. For example, both Henry and Alex were eventually written as cisgender boys, even though that wasn’t necessarily the plan from the beginning. Additionally, many of the characters in Red, White & Royal Blue were inspired by different political ideologies and archetypes instead of real-life people. In interviews about this novel, McQuiston likes to say that “no real royals or first families were harmed in the making this book”.

One Last Stop

McQuiston's next book, One Last Stop, came out on June 1, 2021. The book is "pitched as a queer Kate & Leopold, in which a 23-year-old realizes her subway crush is displaced from 1970's Brooklyn, and she must do everything in her power to help her - and try not to fall in love with the girl lost in time - before it’s too late." McQuiston was inspired to make the setting of this book on a subway because when using this public transportation you get a glimpse of another person's life.

This book follows two young adults who were never supposed to meet as they have a chance encounter because one is lost in time. August, the protagonist, doesn’t believe in love and happily ever afters. She believes that living her life alone is the only way until she meets Jane, the time-traveling love interest, on the subway. The subway quickly becomes August’s favourite part of her day and she realizes that she needs to do everything in her power to help return Jane back to her own time before it’s too late. McQuiston wanted to explore this story within the Romantic comedy genre because they wanted to ensure the characters would get happy endings.

In an interview for Time (magazine), McQuiston expressed that they wanted to create a queer story that centered around a queer cast. McQuiston finds it strange that in many narratives there is only one queer character while the rest of the cast of characters is heterosexual and Cisgender. McQuiston states “I always thought it was silly and unrealistic, the idea that some straight people have, that it is statistically unlikely for more than one gay person to exist in the story.” 

One Last Stop has been placed sixth on the Bookpage top ten romance novels of 2021. The book was also been nominated for the Goodreads Choice Awards for best romance of 2021 where it placed 3rd.

I Kissed Shara Wheeler 
McQuiston's third book, I Kissed Shara Wheeler, was released on May 3, 2022. The book is their first for the young adult age group and is a rom-com set in a Christian high school in Alabama. The book follows Chloe Green after she moves from SoCal to Willowgrove Christian Academy. Her rivalry for valedictorian with Shara Wheeler leads to a kiss before Shara vanishes. Chloe must team up with Shara's other love interests to find her.

McQuiston wrote the book in the tradition of queer coming of age stories set in southern, oppressive religious settings, in part to deal with their own religious trauma. They describe the book as "the most personal thing [they've] ever written."

"Bloody, Lovely" 
On September 20, 2022 McQuiston's short story, "Bloody, Lovely," was featured in a collection of paranormal romance shorts edited by Patrice Caldwell, Eternally Yours. The story follows a young teenager falling in love with the Bloody Mary ghost in their mirror and coming to terms with their queerness.

References 

Living people
Writers from Baton Rouge, Louisiana
Novelists from Louisiana
Louisiana State University alumni
LGBT people from Louisiana
Queer writers
21st-century American novelists
1991 births
21st-century LGBT people
American romantic fiction writers
Bisexual non-binary people
American non-binary writers
American bisexual writers
People with attention deficit hyperactivity disorder